Gberefu Island also known as Point of No Return is a populated historical island located in Badagry, a town and local government area of Lagos State, South-Western Nigeria. Symbolized by two poles slightly slanted towards each other and facing the Atlantic Ocean, the island was a major slave port after it was opened in 1473 during the Trans Atlantic Slave Trade era. According to Nigerian historians, as many as 10,000 slaves were believed to have been shipped to the Caribbean and Americas between 1518 and 1880 from the island.

People
Gberefu Island is headed by two chiefs, all crowned by the same Akran of Badagry Kingdom, and they are; 
I. Chief Yovoyan (The Duheto of Badagry Yovoyan/gbaragada)
II. Chief Najeemu (The Numeto of 
Badagry Gberefu). The Islands first settlers and real landlords are two Ewe communities (villages) under one umbrella, which are gbaragada, Kofeganme (Yovoyan), most of which are fishermen and farmers by occupation, although there are other ethnic groups living in the Daroko area, which comprises the Egun/Ilajes in one harmony with there landlords.

Tourism

Since Gberefu Island is an historic site, it has attracted several tourists around the world thereby increasing its notability. According to a 2015 statistics released on The Guardian, a total number of 3,634 people visited the island in 6 months.

Gallery

Bibliography

References

Populated places in Lagos State
History of Lagos
Historic districts
African slave trade
Tourist attractions in Lagos
History of the Atlantic Ocean
Islands of Lagos
Islands of Yorubaland